The Ectrichodiinae are a subfamily of assassin bugs (Reduviidae) known for specializing on millipedes as prey.  The group comprises more than 600 species in about 115 genera, making it a fairly large subfamily.  The bugs are also known for their aposematic coloration, often brightly colored metallic blue, red, or yellow.

Species of this subfamily hide under leaf litter and sometimes boulders and hunt at night.

Females have wing reduction and or/ extreme sexual dimorphism.

Genera
Austrokatanga Weirauch, 2009
Borgmeierina Wygodzinsky, 1949
Brontostoma Kirkaldy, 1904
Caecina Stål, 1863
Choucoris Cai, 2000
Daraxa Stål, 1859
Echinocoris Livingstone & Ravichandran, 1992
Ectrichodia
Ectrychotes
Glymmatophora Stål, 1855
Guionius
Haematorrhophus
Hemihaematorrhophus Murugan & Livingstone, 1995
Labidocoris
Pseudozirta Berenger & Gil-Santana, 2005
Rhiginia Stål, 1859
Scadra
Stegius
Synectrychotes
Vilius
Zirta Stål, 1859

References

Reduviidae
Hemiptera subfamilies